Alex Kalymnios is an English director, producer and screenwriter.

Early life 
During school Kalymnios wanted to become an actress. When she directed her first school play, she decided that she wanted to become a director. In 2002 she graduated from Bournemouth University with a degree in TV and Video Production. After this she won a placement at the BBC Director's Academy. She later described it as a great learning experience.

Career 
Kalymnios was employed as a runner at Children's BBC. During her four years at Children's BBC she worked up to Assistant Producer. While she was working there she also directed, produced and wrote the short film More Than a Job's Worth. In 2007 Kalymnios started to direct episodes of the TV series Hollyoaks. Until 2009 she directed 13 episodes. From 2008–2012 Kalymnios directed seven episodes of the Hollyoaks spin-off Hollyoaks Later. In 2011 Kalyminos directed the Being Human spin-off Becoming Human. This series brought her a BAFTA Cymru nomination for Digital Creativity and Games and a Banff Rockie Award nomination for Best Webseries – Fiction. Other series that Kalymnios directed were: Seacht, The Cut, EastEnders and Waterloo Road. In 2015 she directed the movie Cleveland Abduction.

Personal life 
Kalymnios is married and has a daughter.

Filmography

Awards and nominations

Wins 
Greenwich International Film Festival
 2005: Best New Director

Nominations
Raindance East Festival
 2005: Best Short Film

BAFTA Cymru Awards:
 2012: Digital Creativity & Games (Becoming Human, shared with Philip Trethowan and Hannah Thomas)

Banff Rockie Award:
 2012: Best Webseries – Fiction (Becoming Human, shared with Hannah Thomas)

References

External links

English television directors
Living people
Year of birth missing (living people)
Place of birth missing (living people)